Anthracophyllum is a genus of fungi in the family Omphalotaceae in the order Agaricales. The genus is widespread in tropical regions, and contains 10 species.

See also

List of Marasmiaceae genera

References

External links

Marasmiaceae
Agaricales genera